Squashfs is a compressed read-only file system for Linux. Squashfs compresses files, inodes and directories, and supports block sizes from 4 KiB up to 1 MiB for greater compression. Several compression algorithms are supported. Squashfs is also the name of free software, licensed under the GPL, for accessing Squashfs filesystems.

Squashfs is intended for general read-only file-system use and in constrained block-device memory systems (e.g. embedded systems) where low overhead is needed.

Uses
Squashfs is used by the Live CD versions of Arch Linux, Debian, Fedora, Gentoo Linux, Linux Mint, openSUSE, Salix, Ubuntu, NixOS, Clonezilla, Kali Linux and on embedded distributions such as the OpenWrt and DD-WRT router firmware. It is also used in Chromecast and for the system partitions of some Android releases (Android Nougat). It is often combined with a union mount filesystem, such as UnionFS, OverlayFS, or aufs, to provide a read-write environment for live Linux distributions. This takes advantage of both Squashfs's high-speed compression abilities and the ability to alter the distribution while running it from a live CD. Distributions such as Debian Live, Mandriva One, Puppy Linux, Salix Live and Slax use this combination. The AppImage project, which aims to create portable linux applications, uses squashfs for creating appimages. The Snappy package manager also uses squashfs for its ".snap file format".

Squashfs is also used by Linux Terminal Server Project and Splashtop. The tools unsquashfs and mksquashfs have been ported to Windows NT – Windows 8.1. 7-Zip also supports Squashfs.

History

Squashfs was initially maintained as an out-of-tree Linux patch. The initial version 1.0 was released on 23 October 2002. In 2009 Squashfs was merged into Linux mainline as part of Linux 2.6.29. In that process, the backward-compatibility code for older formats was removed. Since then the Squashfs kernel-space code has been maintained in the Linux mainline tree, while the user-space tools remain on the project's GitHub page.

The original version of Squashfs used gzip compression, although Linux kernel 2.6.34 added support for LZMA and LZO compression, Linux kernel 2.6.38 added support for LZMA2 compression (which is used by xz), Linux kernel 3.19 added support for LZ4 compression, and Linux kernel 4.14 added support for Zstandard compression.

Linux kernel 2.6.35 added support for extended file attributes.

See also

 AppImage
 Btrfs
 Cloop
 Comparison of file systems
 Cramfs
 e2compr
 EROFS
 Initramfs
 List of file systems

References

External links
 

Compression file systems
Free special-purpose file systems
Read-only file systems supported by the Linux kernel
Free software programmed in C